Gazing at the Moonlight is the debut studio album by American rapper Hopsin. It was released on October 27, 2009, through Ruthless Records. This was Hopsin's only record released with Ruthless Records as the album created bitter tension between Ruthless and Hopsin, due to the lack of promotion and financial compensation for the album. Gazing at the Moonlight was supported by two singles: "Pans in the Kitchen" and "I'm Here".

The title refers to "Gazing at the Moonlight" hoping and wishing on a dream to come true. The album stylistically incorporates elements of horrorcore, pop rap and comedy hip hop. In various interviews Hopsin discourages fans against buying the CD, due to its release on Ruthless, however, although the iTunes edition is widely available, the CD cannot be commonly found in music stores and is considered rare as the physical CD edition costs between $20–30.

Background and recording
In 2007, Hopsin signed a deal with Ruthless Records, and was hailed as one of driving forces behind the attempt to bring Ruthless Records back to previous glory. The album was set to be self-produced by Hopsin and feature no collaborations with other artists, however, the final edition featured vocals from DJ K on the hook of the song "Motherfucker". However, the album was not released until October 27, 2009, with little to no promotion. After the album's release, Hopsin sought his release from Ruthless due to lack of financial compensation, artist support, and promotion. Due to the departure from Ruthless Records, Hopsin founded his own independent label, called Funk Volume, with Damien Ritter. SwizZz, Damien Ritter's younger brother and former classmate of Hopsin at Monroe High, was the first artist to be signed to Funk Volume. After launching Funk Volume, both Hopsin and SwizZz released a collaborative mixtape, titled Haywire in June 2009, to promote the label. Funk Volume wanted to sell it for retail sale, but were unable to, due to Hopsin still being contracted by Ruthless Records at the time.

In an interview, Hopsin stated that many of the songs such as "Pans in the Kitchen" were performed and written when he was in the twelfth grade and he initially anticipated the album would be released in 2007 due to the album being completed long before the release, however Hopsin was unaware of Ruthless Records plans.

Promotion
The album's first promotional single, "Sexy Cyber" was released and produced in 2007 with a music video, however, the video was not released due to issues with Ruthless Records until 2011. The album's lead single, "Pans in the Kitchen", was released on May 27, 2008, accompanied by a music video. The album's second single, "I'm Here", was released on March 17, 2009, in promotion of the album's release, a music video for the song was shot but remained unreleased until 2013 due to Hopsin's issues with Ruthless. A music video for, "Motherfucker", was released on April 10, 2010 and features vocals from DJ K and marked the final release of Hopsin before his departure from Ruthless Records in mid 2010. A music video for "Break It Down" was shot but remained unreleased until it was leaked onto YouTube.

Commercial performance
The album was a commercial failure. According to Hopsin, the album sold 42 copies in its first week, with about 5 or 6 copies purchased by him and his mother.
The album has sold over 100,000 copies in streaming since releasing the album on his own.

Track listing
 All songs produced and written by Marcus Hopson

References

2009 debut albums
Hopsin albums
Ruthless Records albums